Ione Community Charter School is a public charter school in Ione, Oregon, United States.

Academics
In 2008, 100% of the school's seniors received a high school diploma. Of 15 students, 15 graduated and none dropped out.

References

High schools in Morrow County, Oregon
Charter schools in Oregon
Public middle schools in Oregon
Education in Morrow County, Oregon
Public elementary schools in Oregon
Public high schools in Oregon